Hassan Danaeifar is an Iranian military officer in the Islamic Revolutionary Guard Corps. He served as Iran's ambassador to Iraq from 2010 to 2017. Prior to the appointment, he held office as the secretary-general of the 'Iran–Iraq Economic Development Center' and head of the 'Headquarters for the Restoration of Holy Shrines'.

Early life
Danaeifar was born in 1962 in Baghdad, Iraq. He was among the Iraqi Moavedin who took refuge in Iran during the 1980s.

Military career
Danaeifar served most of his career in the Islamic Revolutionary Guard Corps as a civil engineer and logistician. He was the deputy commander of the IRGC Navy and commander of the Khatam-al Anbiya Construction Headquarters. He also served in the Quds Force.

References

Living people
1962 births
Quds Force personnel
Ambassadors of Iran to Iraq
Iraqi emigrants to Iran
Iranian Arab military personnel
Politicians from Baghdad
Islamic Revolutionary Guard Corps brigadier generals